The family Leptoceridae are a family of caddisflies often called "long-horned caddisflies". Leptoceridae is the second largest family of caddisflies with more than 1500 species in around 45 genera. The main identifying feature of most Leptoceridae is that their antennae are longer than those of other caddisflies. There is one genus with short antennae (Ceraclea), but it is easily identified by the pair of dark curved lines on the mesonotum.

The type genus for Leptoceridae is Leptocerus W.E. Leach, 1815.

Genera
These 53 genera belong to the family Leptoceridae:

 Achoropsyche Holzenthal, 1984 i c g
 Adicella McLachlan, 1877 i c g
 Amazonatolica Holzenthal & Pes, 2004 g
 Amphoropsyche Holzenthal, 1985 i c g
 Atanatolica Mosely, 1936 i c g
 Athripsodes Billberg, 1820 i c g
 Axiocerina Ross, 1957 i c g
 Blyzophilus Anderson, Kjaerandsen, & Morse, 1999 i c g
 Brachysetodes Schmid, 1955 i c g
 Ceraclea Stephens, 1829 i c g b
 Condocerus Neboiss, 1977 i c g
 Creterotesis Ivanov, 2006 g
 Erotesis McLachlan, 1877 i c g
 Fernandoschmidia Holzenthal & Andersen, 2007 g
 Gracilipsodes Sykora, 1967 g
 Grumichella Mueller, 1879 i c g
 Hemileptocerus Ulmer, 1922 i c g
 Homilia McLachlan, 1877 i c g
 Hudsonema Mosely, 1936 i c g
 Lectrides Mosely in Mosely & Kimmins, 1953 i c g
 Leptecho Barnard, 1934 i c g
 Leptoceriella Schmid, 1993 i c g
 Leptocerina Mosely, 1932 i c g
 Leptocerus Leach in Brewster, 1815 i c g b
 Leptorussa Mosely in Mosely & Kimmins, 1953 i c g
 Magadacerina Malm & Johanson, 2013 g
 Mystacides Berthold, 1827 i c g b
 Nectopsyche Mueller, 1879 i c g b (white millers)
 Neoathripsodes Holzenthal, 1989 i c g
 Nietnerella Kimmins, 1963 i c g
 Notalina Mosely, 1936 i c g
 Notoperata Neboiss, 1977 i c g
 Oecetis McLachlan, 1877 i c g b
 Parasetodes McLachlan, 1880 i c g
 Perissomyia Ulmer, 1912 g
 Poecilopsyche Schmid, 1968 i c g
 Praeathripsodes Botosaneanu & Wichard, 1983 g
 Ptochoecetis Ulmer, 1931 i c g
 Russobex StClair, 1988 i c g
 Sericodes Schmid, 1987 i c g
 Setodes Rambur, 1842 i c g b
 Symphitoneuria Ulmer, 1906 i c g
 Symphitoneurina Schmid, 1950 i c
 Tagalopsyche Banks, 1913 i c g
 Triaenodella Mosely, 1932 g
 Triaenodes McLachlan, 1865 i c g b
 Trichosetodes Ulmer, 1915 i c g
 Triplectides Kolenati, 1859 i c g
 Triplectidina Mosely, 1936 i c g
 Triplexa Mosely in Mosely & Kimmins, 1953 i c g
 Triplexina Mosely in Mosely & Kimmins, 1953 i c g
 Westriplectes Neboiss, 1977 i c g
 Ylodes Milne, 1934 i c g

Data sources: i = ITIS, c = Catalogue of Life, g = GBIF, b = Bugguide.net

References

External links

 

Trichoptera families
Integripalpia